The Ntimbale Dam is a dam on the Tati River in Botswana.

Construction

The dam project was assigned to Knight Piésold by the Botswana Department of Water Affairs.
Knight Piésold undertook the Feasibility study in 1996–97, assisted in the tender process, prepared the detailed design and supervised construction between 2004 and 2009.
PPC Cement of South Africa, which has a blending and packing plant in Gaborone, supplied the cement for the project.
The dam complex includes pump stations and a water treatment plant, and supplies water to villages in the North East District and neighboring parts of the Central District.

The dam cost an estimated P205 million.  While it was being built, a water-transfer scheme costing P280 million was undertaken to connect all of the 51 villages in the North East District.
President Ian Khama commissioned the dam at a ceremony in October 2008, saying he hoped it would meet domestic water supply needs for the next twenty years. He cautioned that people should continue to use water carefully and avoid waste.

References

Sources

 

Reservoirs and dams in Botswana
Dams in Botswana